A lap is a surface (usually horizontal) created between the knee and hips of a biped when it is in a seated or lying down position. The lap of a parent or loved one is seen as a physically and psychologically comfortable place for a child to sit. 

In some countries where Christmas is celebrated, it has been a tradition for children to sit on the lap of a person dressed as Santa Claus to tell Santa what they want for Christmas, and have their picture taken, but this practice has since been questioned in some of these countries, where this sort of contact between children and unfamiliar adults raises concerns.

Among adults, a person sitting on the lap of another usually indicates an intimate or romantic relationship between the two; this is a factor in the erotic activity in strip clubs known as a lap dance, where one person straddles the lap of the other and gyrates their lower extremities in a provocative manner. 

A Lap steel guitar is a type of steel guitar played in a sitting position with the instrument placed horizontally across the player's knees. The lap can be a useful surface for carrying out tasks when a table is not available. The laptop computer was so named because it was seen as being able to be used on the user's lap.

See also
Lap dog
Laptop

References

Human anatomy
Lower limb anatomy